Mount Priestley may refer to:

 Mount Priestley (Antarctica)
 Mount Priestley (British Columbia) in British Columbia, Canada